The Neverending Story is a fantasy novel by German writer Michael Ende, published in 1979. The first English translation, by Ralph Manheim, was published in 1983. It was later adapted into a film series.

Plot summary
The book centres on a boy, Bastian Balthazar Bux, an overweight and strange child who is neglected by his father after the death of Bastian's mother. While escaping from some bullies, Bastian bursts into the antiquarian book store of Carl Conrad Coreander, where he finds his interest held by a book called The Neverending Story. Unable to resist, he steals the book and hides in his school's attic, where he begins to read.

The story Bastian reads is set in the magical land of Fantastica, a place of wonder ruled by the benevolent and mysterious Childlike Empress. A great delegation has come to the Empress to seek her help against a formless entity called "The Nothing". The delegates are shocked when the Empress's physician, a centaur named Cairon, informs them that the Empress is ill, and has chosen a boy warrior named Atreyu to find a cure. Upon finding Atreyu, Cairon gives him AURYN: a powerful medallion that protects him from all harm. At the advice of the giant turtle Morla the Aged One, Atreyu sets off in search of an invisible oracle known as Uyulala, who may know the Empress's cure. In reaching her, he is aided by a luckdragon named Falkor, whom he rescues from the shapeshifting creature Ygramul the Many. By Uyulala, he is told the only thing that can save the Empress is a new name given to her by a human, who can only be found beyond Fantastica's borders.

Through reading the story, Bastian becomes increasingly disturbed by hints that the characters are somehow aware that he is reading their adventures, being able to hear or even see him at points. As Falkor and Atreyu search for the borders of Fantastica, Atreyu is flung from Falkor's back in a confrontation with the four Wind Giants and loses AURYN in the sea. Atreyu lands in the ruins of Spook City, the home of various creatures of darkness. Wandering the dangerous city, Atreyu finds the wolf Gmork, chained and near death, who tells him that all the residents of the city have leapt voluntarily into The Nothing. There, thanks to the irresistible pull of the destructive phenomenon, the Fantasticans are becoming lies in the human world. The wolf also reveals that he is a servant of the force behind The Nothing and was sent to prevent the Empress's chosen hero from saving her. Gmork then reveals that when the princess of the city discovered his treachery against the Empress, she imprisoned him and left him to starve to death. When Atreyu announces that he is the hero Gmork has sought, the wolf laughs and succumbs to death. When approached, Gmork's body instinctively seizes Atreyu's leg in his jaws, preventing him from being dragged by the Nothing. Meanwhile, Falkor retrieves AURYN from the sea and arrives in time to save Atreyu from the rapid approach of The Nothing.

Falkor and Atreyu go to the Childlike Empress, who assures them they have brought her rescuer to her; Bastian suspects that the Empress means him, but cannot bring himself to believe it. When Bastian refuses to speak the new name, to prompt him into fulfilling his role as savior, the Empress herself locates the Old Man of Wandering Mountain, who possesses a book also entitled The Neverending Story, which the Empress demands he read aloud. As he begins, Bastian is amazed to find the book he is reading is repeating itself, beginning once again whenever the Empress reaches the Old Man — only this time, the story includes Bastian's meeting with Coreander, his theft of the book, and all his actions in the attic. Realizing that the story will repeat itself forever without his intervention, Bastian names the Empress "Moon Child", and appears with her in Fantastica, where he restores its existence through his own imagination. The Empress has also given him AURYN, on the back of which he finds the inscription "Do What You Wish".

For each wish, Bastian loses a memory of his life as a human. Unaware of this at first, Bastian goes through Fantastica, having adventures and telling stories, while losing his memories. In spite of the warnings of Atreyu and Bastian's other friends, Bastian uses AURYN to create creatures and dangers for himself to conquer, which causes some negative side effects for the rest of Fantastica. After being abetted by the wicked sorceress Xayide, and with the mysterious absence of the Childlike Empress, Bastian decides to take over Fantastica as emperor. During his coronation ceremony he is stopped by Atreyu, whom Bastian grievously wounds in battle. Bastian then enters "Old Emperor City", inhabited by human beings who came to Fantastica earlier but could not find their way out, eking out a meaningless existence there. Ultimately, a repentant Bastian is reduced to two memories: that of his father, and of his own name. After more adventures, Bastian must give up the memory of his father to discover that his strongest wish is to be capable of love and to give love to others.

After much searching, and on the verge of losing his final memory, Bastian is unable to find the Water of Life with which to leave Fantastica with his memories. Here, he is found by Atreyu. In remorse, Bastian lays down AURYN at his friend's feet, and Atreyu and Falkor enter AURYN with him, where the Water of Life demands to know Bastian's name, and if Bastian has finished all the stories he began in his journey, which he has not. Only after Atreyu gives Bastian's name and promises to complete all the stories for him does the Water of Life allow Bastian to return to the human world, along with some of the mystical waters. After drinking the Water of Life, Bastian returns to his original form, and feels comfortable and happy with it. He wanted to bring the water also to his father. He returns to his father, where he tells the full tale of his adventures, and thus reconciles with him. Afterward, Bastian confesses to Coreander about stealing his book and losing it, but Coreander denies ever owning such a book. He reveals he has also been to Fantastica, that the book has likely moved into the hands of someone else and that Bastian—like he did—will eventually show that person the way to Fantastica. This, the book concludes, "is another story and shall be told another time".

Editions
The Neverending Story was first published under the title Die unendliche Geschichte in 1979 by West German publisher Thienemann Verlag. It was number one on West Germany's highly respected Der Spiegel bestseller list for 113 weeks, and remained on the list for 332 weeks. The original edition was printed using red and green text: red writing to represent the story lines which take place in the human world, and green writing to represent the events taking place in Fantastica. The illustrations by Roswitha Quadflieg that begin each chapter are drawn in both colors to illustrate how the two worlds intertwine. It was initially only printed as a hardcover, not paperback, because Ende wanted the book to look as much as possible like the book that Bastian steals from Mr. Coreander in the story.

The English version, translated by Ralph Manheim, was published simultaneously in the United Kingdom and United States in 1983. Several other English-language editions have since been published, with a variety of covers and lettering styles. As of 2010, The Neverending Story has been translated into 36 languages, and sold more than eight million copies worldwide.

In 1998 Der Niemandsgarten (English: The No Man's Garden) was published. This anthology of Michael Ende's unpublished works includes insight on the creation of The Neverending Story and has been translated into Japanese but not English. Also unavailable in English is Aber das ist eine andere Geschichte – Das große Michael Ende Lesebuch (English: But that is Another Story: The Big Michael Ende Reader), which contains the previously unpublished chapter "Bastian erlernt die Zauberkunst" (English: "Bastian learns the art of magic").

Reception
A survey conducted by German filmmaker Ulli Pfau found that The Neverending Story appeals particularly to readers aged 18–35. It remains most successful in Germany and Japan, while the 1984 film tends to be more well known among English-speaking audiences.

Early reviews of the English-language edition included positive reviews in Library Journal and Kirkus Reviews, the latter calling The Neverending Story an "appealing, delicately wrought, engrossing adventure—for children of all ages". A less positive review in gaming magazine White Dwarf took issue with the appearance of the physical book, writing that "despite plush production the artwork is grotty, while the promised 'shimmering copper-coloured silk' binding looks like plain red cloth to me. A good buy, though, unless you suffer from red/green colour blindness".

In subsequent years the text of The Neverending Story has been analyzed from several different viewpoints. In The Rhetoric of Character in Children's Literature, literary critic Maria Nikolajeva states that "the two parts of the novel repeat each other" in that Bastian becomes a hero but then in the second half he "acts not even as an antihero but as a false hero of the fairy tale" and the characters of Bastian and Atreyu can also be seen as mirror halves. Helmut Gronemann's Fantastica—the Realm of the Unconscious explores the novel from a Jungian point of view, identifying archetypes and symbols in the story. Additionally, some religious groups have analyzed the text for occult messages and imagery.

Adaptations and derivative works

Music
The album Wooden Heart by Listener was based on or heavily influenced by The Neverending Story, as has been confirmed by the band. Different songs represent different ideas of the plot or characters, which can be seen on the band's lyric page for the album.

The Spanish indie rock band Vetusta Morla derived its name from the ancient turtle in the novel, and the Spanish boyband Auryn derived its name from the medallion given to Atreyu and Bastian.

The band Bayside released a song called "They Looked Like Strong Hands" on their self titled album in 2005, referencing the speech Rockbiter gives to Bastian.

The metalcore band Atreyu derives their name from the character of that name in The Neverending Story.

The hip-hop artist Homeboy Sandman references Atreyu and Falkor in his 2019 song "Far Out".

British pop singer Limahl sang the English version of the song on the soundtrack of the film in 1984.

Audiobook
A German dramatized audioplay under the title Die unendliche Geschichte (Karussell/Universal Music Group 1984, directed by Anke Beckert, music by Frank Duval, 3 parts on LP and MC, 2 parts on CD).

In March 2012 Tantor Media released an unabridged audiobook of The Neverending Story narrated by Gerard Doyle.

Film

The NeverEnding Story was the first film adaptation of the novel. It was released in 1984, directed by Wolfgang Petersen and starring Barret Oliver as Bastian, Noah Hathaway as Atreyu, and Tami Stronach as the Childlike Empress. It covers only the first half of the book, ending at the point where Bastian enters Fantastica (renamed "Fantasia" in the film), and features characters who look markedly different from how they are described in the book (most notably Bastian, who is very self-conscious about his weight in the book, but is depicted as slender in the film). Ende, who was reportedly "revolted" by the film, requested they halt production or change the film's name, as he felt it had ultimately and drastically deviated from his novel; when they did neither, he sued them and subsequently lost the case.

The NeverEnding Story II: The Next Chapter, directed by George T. Miller and starring Jonathan Brandis and Kenny Morrison, was released in 1990. It used plot elements primarily from the second half of Ende's novel, but told a new tale. Ende has dismissed both the 1984 film and its 1990 sequel as "gigantic melodrama made of kitsch and commerce, plush and plastic".

The NeverEnding Story III, directed by Peter MacDonald and starring Jason James Richter, Melody Kay and Jack Black, was released in 1994 in Germany. This film was primarily based only upon the characters from Ende's book but had an original story. The film was lambasted by film critics for its poor and laughable dialogue and special effects and was a box-office bomb. In addition, the US release went straight-to-video and received a limited theatrical run in 1996.

Novels
From 2003 to 2004, the German publishing house AVAinternational published six novels of different authors in a series called Legends of Fantastica, each using parts of the original plot and characters to compose an entirely new storyline:

Stage
The world première of the stage production took place in 2012 in Brisbane, Australia, by the Harvest Rain Theatre Company.

In Germany, The Neverending Story has been variously adapted to a stage play, ballet and opera, which premiered both at Trier and at Weimar Nationaltheater on 10 April 2004, and was subsequently staged at Linz Landestheater on 11 December. The scores to both the opera and the ballet versions were composed by Siegfried Matthus. The opera libretto was by Anton Perry.

In Canada, the novel was adapted to stage for the Stratford Festival for the 2019 season adapted by David S. Craig with original music by Hawksley Workman.

Television
The 1995 animated series was produced by Canadian animation studio Nelvana, under the title of The Neverending Story: The Animated Adventures of Bastian Balthazar Bux. The animated series ran for two years, and had a total of twenty-six episodes. Director duties were split between Marc Boreal and Mike Fallows. Each episode focused on Bastian's further adventures in Fantastica, largely different from his further adventures in the book, but occasionally containing elements of them.

Tales from the Neverending Story, a one-season-only TV series that is loosely based on Ende's novel, was produced in Montreal, Quebec, Canada, through December 2000 to August 2002 and distributed by Muse Entertainment, airing on HBO in 2002. It was aired as four two-hour television movies in the US and as a TV series of 13 one-hour episodes in the United Kingdom. The series was released on DVD in 2001.

In the season two finale of The Venture Bros., "Showdown at Cremation Creek (Part II)", Dean Venture embarks upon a fantastical, hallucinated adventure that closely borrows from The Neverending Story.

Google Doodle
On 1 September 2016, a Google Doodle created by Google artist Sophie Diao commemorated the publication of the work.

Video games
A text adventure was released by Ocean Software in 1985 for the ZX Spectrum, Amstrad CPC, Commodore 64, and Atari 8-bit family.

A video game based on the second film was released in 1990 by Merimpex Ltd under their Linel label and re-released by System 4 for the ZX Spectrum and Commodore 64.

In 2001, the German video game studio attraction published their Ende-inspired video game, AURYN Quest.

References

External links

 The Neverending Story at The Encyclopedia of Fantasy
 
 

 
1979 children's books
1979 fantasy novels
1979 German novels
Anthroposophy
Books about dragons
Children's fantasy novels
Fiction about giants
German children's novels
German fantasy novels
German novels adapted into films
German-language novels
High fantasy novels
Metafictional novels
Novels by Michael Ende
Witchcraft in written fiction